"Kong Yiji" is a short-story by Lu Xun, the founder of modern Chinese literature. The story was originally published in the journal New Youth (Chinese: 新青年) in April 1919 and was later included in Lu Xun's first collection of short stories, Call to Arms (Chinese: 吶喊). The story's narrator reminisces about Kong Yiji, a pedantic scholar who became the laughing-stock of the tavern where the narrator worked. In the end, Kong's legs were broken as punishment for stealing books. He is a ridiculous and pathetic character, a symbol for the indifference between people in the old days.

Plot
The narrator reminisces about the time twenty years ago when he worked in a tavern in Luzhen (Chinese: 鲁镇), a fictional town where many of Lu Xun's stories are set.

Kong Yiji was a self-styled scholar who filled his speech with literary jargon. He was the only customer who wore a scholar's long gown and drank his wine while standing. He had often been laughed at contemptuously by other customers, who gave him the nickname "Kong Yiji". Kong Yiji was poor and sometimes stole books, but he never defaulted on payment of the tavern. He was willing to teach the narrator about writing and shared fennel peas with children. Later, Kong Yiji had been caught stealing and was beaten until his legs broke. He dragged himself to the tavern and ordered some wine. After that, he was not seen again and presumably died as a result of his injuries.

Background

Historical background 
At the end of the 19th century, the Qing government was corrupt and people were living in poverty. The imperial examination system that had been in place since the Sui and Tang dynasties still prevailed. Scholars who passed the exams were awarded government office, but they were few in number. Many who failed the exams were left poor and destitute. Kong Yiji was a typical example of those who studied the classics for most of their lives but failed the exams.

After the Xinhai Revolution in 1911, Yuan Shikai attempted to become emperor. The restoration forces were rampant, and the results of the revolution were stolen. During the late Qing reforms of 1905, the imperial examination system was abolished, but traditional culture and education were still deeply rooted.

The October Revolution of 1917 showed the power of Marxism-Leninism to transform a large Asian empire into a strong nation. Chinese revolutionary intellectuals such as Li Dazhao initiated the New Culture Movement and mounted a fierce attack on Confucian culture and education. Lu Xun was a powerful voice in this movement to crush Confucian culture, and to "depict a life or a life in society for readers to see".

Creation background 
"Kong Yiji" was written in the winter of 1918, when the New Youth unveiled the prelude to the New Cultural Movement, but the counter-current of retrogression was still rampant. Although the imperial examination system was abolished in 1906, the social foundation for cultivating people like Kong Yiji still existed. Confucius and Mencius were still the core elements of social education. To arouse the young generation, Lu Xun created a set of the Xianheng Tavern in Luzhen and artistically showed the lives of poor intellectuals in society more than 20 years ago. He aimed to inspire readers to think about the social situation and criticize the imperial examination system. One of the statements about the purpose of the story is that Lu Xun wrote this story to express the protest of the college students at that time. Other claims suggest that Lu Xun wrote the story to explain the problems with China's old society, where people could waste their entire lives trying to pass meaningless examinations and where people were selfish and indifferent to the plight of others. Lu Xun opposed the traditional Chinese system of education based on imperial examinations and the cruelty of Chinese society.

Appearance 
At the beginning: He was very tall. The pallid face was covered with scars among the wrinkles. He has a messy white beard. Although he wore a long gown, the clothes were dirty and torn, which seemed to have not been mended or washed for more than ten years.

After breaking legs: His face was dark and lean, which was in a bad shape. He wore a ragged jacket and crossed his legs sitting on a futon which attached to his shoulders by a straw rope.

Character features 
Kong Yiji lived in the transition period between the old and new society, which gave him two sides to his character. On the one hand, Kong Yiji is kind and honest. On the other hand, he is pedantic and stubborn. His character features make readers mourn his misfortune and anger for his cowardice. The character of Kong Yiji is undoubtedly a tragic figure.

Wearing a long gown and standing drink 
Kong Yiji was the only customer who wore a long gown and drank his wine standing. In the story's setting, the long-shirted customers are upper-class people who sit down to drink, while the lower-class people in short shirts can only stand and drink outside the cabinet. Kong Yiji is a long-gown man who drink his wine standing, which seems to be quite contradictory.

Kong Yiji's speech was filled with literary jargon, which made others cannot completely understand. As his surname was Kong, people gave him a nickname mockingly from the copybooks for calligraphy called Kong Yiji. The archaism in the speech and the long gown show that Kong Yiji is a scholar, who should have been in the upper class. However, Kong Yiji's long gown is tattered, and he is ridiculed by others. Even the nickname "Kong Yiji" has become his official name. This character feature reflects the miserable fate of a lower-class scholar in the old society. It also shows that it is imperial examination system which created such people.

Lazy but never default 

Kong Yiji has accepted education but finally did not enter the college. And he cannot make a living, so he became penniless, even had to beg for food. Kong Yiji was deeply influenced by the imperial examination system. Although he had become a laughingstock, he still believed that only those who studied could enter the upper class. Even though he failed to pass the Xiucai examination and was reduced to begging for a living, he still despised labor and put on the air of a scholar.

Kong Yiji had good handwriting. He copied books by hand to exchange some food. However, he also had a bad temper, which was laziness and taking to drinking. Sitting without a few days, he would disappear with all his books, paper, pen, and ink. As several times, there was no person to ask him for transcribing books. Kong Yiji did not have any solutions, so he occasionally did some theft. However, in our store, his behavior was better than other people's because he never defaulted. Although sometimes he had no cash and his name was temporarily recorded on the powder board, he would pay off within a month and erase his name Kong Yiji from the board. Kong Yiji was lazy, but he never defaulted on his payments of drinks, reflecting his contradictory character traits. Although Kong Yiji was deeply influenced by the pedantic Imperial Examination system, he still retained honesty as a traditional virtue.

Honest and kind 
Kong Yiji is willing to teach other people. One time he asked me (the narrator in the story): "Have you ever read a book?" I nodded my head slightly. He said: "Read a book……Then I’ll test you. How to write the word hui in hui-xiang( Chinese: 茴香; translation: fennel) peas?" I thought that a bagger was not qualified to test me. So, I turned my face back and ignored him. Kong Yiji waited for a long time and continued earnestly: "You don’t know how to write it? I will teach you. You need to remember this. Later when you open your store, this word will be used when keeping accounts." I thought secretly that I was so far away from owning my own store, and I never wrote hui-xiang peas on the account. I felt funny and impatient, and responded idly: "Who wants you to teach? Isn't it the character hui with the grass radical?" Kong Yiji was pleased and used his long nail of the two fingers to knock the counter, nodded, and said: "Yes, Yes! There are four ways to write this word. Do you know them?" I became more impatient and walked away with pouting lips. Kong Yiji just dipped his fingers in the wine and tended to write on the counter. When he saw how unenthusiastic I was, he sighed disappointedly. Kong Yiji believes that only a scholar could enter the upper class, so he enthusiastically teaches the story's narrator, a young fellow working in a tavern, to read and write, which reflects his kindness and sincerity.

Kong Yiji's kindness was also reflected in giving fennel peas to children. A few times, the neighborhood children heard the laughter, also came and surrounded Kong Yiji. He then gave each kid a hui-xiang peas. The kids ate the peas but did not disperse, and their eyes were still looking at the dish. Kong Yiji was flustered and stretched out his five fingers to cover the plate, bent down, and said, "There isn’t much more. I don't have much more." He stood up and looked at the peas again, shaking his head and repeated with literary jargon, "Not much! Verily, not much, forsooth!" Then, the group of kids all went away in laughter. Although Kong Yiji was made fun of by people and was at the bottom of the social ladder, he was still kind to the children around him. He was so poor that he did not have much money to buy fennel peas, but he was still willing to share them with the children.

Acts Dignified but Resorted to Stealing 
Once Kong Yiji arrived at the tavern, everyone looked at him and chuckled, and some called out, "Kong Yiji, you've got a new scar on your face!" He did not answer but said to the counter, "Warm two bowls of wine and a plate of hui-xiang peas." Then he gave out nine coins. Some drinkers deliberately shouted again, "You must have stolen something again!" Kong Yiji opened his eyes wide and said, "How can you slander like this ......" "Slander? The day before yesterday, I saw you were hung up and beaten for stealing a book from the He family!" Kong Yiji then flushed. The forehead of the veins standing out, and he argued, "Taking a book cannot be considered stealing ...... Taking a book! ......Can the affair of a scholar be considered stealing?" The following quotations are difficult to understand, such as a gentleman keeps his integrity even in poverty, and some other literary jargon. Everyone laughed, and the tavern is full of a joyous atmosphere. Although Kong Yiji prides himself on being a scholar and has dignity, he steals books. It is the greatest contradiction in this character. Since he believes that scholars are more noble than others, he does not admit that stealing books is theft, reflecting his pedantry and absurdity. It is also the main reason for his tragedy in the end.

Social significance

Criticism of old society and imperial examination 
The tragedy of Kong Yiji embodies the destruction of intellectuals by the old society and ideology. In the history of Chinese old society, the ruling class set up the imperial examination system to manage scholars and instill the idea of "learning is second to none". As a result, many people staked their fate on the imperial examinations and wasted a lot of time, but still lived in poverty. Kong Yiji is the epitome of the intellectuals in the lower class. This character shows the psychological state and tragic end of such scholars. Lu Xun uses this character to illustrate the decadence of people educated by the imperial examination system and the tragedy of Chinese intellectuals in the late Qing Dynasty.

Reflection of the indifference between people 
The misfortune of Kong Yiji was not an isolated case but a common phenomenon in the old society. The ridicule of the customers in the Xianheng Tavern further led to the tragedy of the times. People made fun of the lower-class intellectuals to gain temporary satisfaction and pleasure without sympathy for their miserable situations. The suffering of those people has become derision for others. Lu Xun uses the character to reflect the indifference of society and the numbness of people's minds.

Prototype
There are many different versions of the prototype of Kong Yiji in folklore. Three of the most famous and evidence-based versions are Meng Fuzi, Siqi ,and Mr. Yiran.

Meng Fuzi 
According to Mr. Lu Xun, there is indeed such a person, surnamed Meng, who often drinks at the Xianheng Tavern and is called "Meng Fuzi". His behavior is similar to what describes in Kong Yiji.

Meng Fuzi’s real name was lost. He had studied but finally did not enter college. He did not know how to make a living, so he was poor and could only beg for food. He copied books for others, but he liked to drink, and sometimes he even sold his books, paper, and pencils for drinking. When he was poor, he went into the school to steal something, but he was caught, saying that it was "stealing" books and could not be considered stealing. He often came to the Xianheng Tavern to drink wine and probably lived near the place, but no one knew it. After breaking his legs, he used two hands to support the walk and came to the tavern to drink. However, after that, nobody has ever seen him.

Siqi 
The prototype of Kong Yiji is called “Siqi”. The man was addicted to drinking and opium, but he had good handwriting. He often wandered around wearing a shabby and ragged gown and a skull cap on his head. He liked to swear and abuse and was often beaten by people.

Mr. Yiran 
According to legend, there was a person named "Mr. Yiran" in Shaoxing City. This person was living in poverty. To make a living, he could only sell breakfast to barely getting by. As he refused to take off his long gown and did not want to hawk aloud, he had to follow other vendors selling breakfast. The hawkers shouted once, and he followed behind with a low voice of "Yiran" (Chinese: 亦然, an archaism means “me too”), which was ridiculous. When the children on the street saw him wearing a long gown, carrying a basket, and mumbling words they did not understand, they gathered around and laughed, calling him "Mr. Yiran”. Since then, "Mr. Yiran" has become famous in Shaoxing City.

"After selling breakfast, Mr. Yiran slowly paced to Xianheng Tavern, taking out a few coins and asking for a bowl of wine and a plate of fennel peas, and slowly drank while chewing the fennel peas with great relish. When the children saw "Mr. Yiran" drinking, they rushed to ask for fennel peas to eat. He gave one to each child until very few fennel peas were left on the plate, then he covered the plate with his hand and chanted, "Not many. Not too many."

It is said that this "Mr. Yiran" is the prototype of Kong Yiji in Lu Xun’s story.

Scholars' comments 

 Zhu Zuoren: Kong Yiji is a representative of a descendant of a declining family and a poor scholar, and the author has used his story to describe the end of this group of people.
Qian Liqun: Kong Yiji is a scholar in the old society who deserves sympathy and concerns, who have a tragic and absurd status and fate.
 Zhu Shoutong: The character of Kong Yiji has deeply influenced the mindset of generations of Chinese, and has subtly changed the spirit of many Chinese people.
Liu Zaifu: A poor and miserable "superfluous person", a lower-class intellectual who has lost his human dignity and qualifications and is disgraced by society.
American scholar Li Oufan (Leo Lee): Kong Yiji's behavioral characteristics precisely epitomize the spiritual problems of a generation during a certain historical turn. His attachment to some traditional values and his pedantic habits pathetically supports his life but cannot make him slightly noble. Therefore, although suffering like that, Kong Yiji is not a hero, but only a loser despised by the customers in the Xianheng Tavern.

See also

References

References and further reading
 Lu, Xun, Editor: Kevin Nadolny, Illustrations by Baidi and Gege. Short Stories from Lǔ Xùn's Nàhǎn. Capturing Chinese, July 1, 2009. , 9780984276202.
 
 , pp. 32-36.

External links
 Full text of 孔乙己 in Chinese at Wikisource

1919 short stories
Short stories by Lu Xun
Short stories set in China